The Mass Rapid Transit Master Plan in Bangkok Metropolitan Region, or M-Map, is the latest version in a series of Thai government plans for the development of an urban rail transit network serving the Greater Bangkok area. It was drafted under the care of the Office of Transport and Traffic Policy and Planning (OTP) of the Ministry of Transport.

Early versions (Old plans)

Mass Rapid Transit Systems Master Plan (MTMP)

Urban Rail Transportation Master Plan in Bangkok and Surrounding Areas (URMAP)

Bangkok Mass Transit Master Plan (BMT)
The plan was approved by the cabinet in 2016, and consisted of the following extensions:
  Light Green Line: North–south extension of the BTS to Khu Khot and Kheha Samut Prakan
  Dark Green Line: West extension of the BTS to Yot Se
  Blue Line: Extension of the MRT Blue Line to complete a quasi circle line with a branch to Lak Song 
  Purple Line: South extension to Rat Burana is under construction
  Orange Line: Running east–west Min Buri to Bang Khun Non
  SRT Dark Red Line: Running north–southwest from Rangsit to Krung Thep Aphiwat to Maha Chai
  SRT Light Red Line: running east–west from Hua Mak to Sala Ya
   Airport Rail Link: North extension to Don Mueang

M-Map development

Original M-Map (2010) 

The first M-Map plan was endorsed by the Commission for the Management of Land Traffic in 2010. It designated eight primary routes, consisting of two commuter rail lines, an airport rail link, and five rapid transit lines, as well as five feeder lines. The routes, totaling , were to be constructed within a development period of twenty years (2010–29). They were:

Development would be divided into three stages, in addition to those lines already open or under construction.

M-Map 2 (2017) 
The 2010 M-Map did not reflect more recent changes to the priority of constructing new rapid transit lines in Bangkok. While the Orange, Yellow and Pink lines received approval in the years that followed, the Grey and Light Blue lines remained unapproved at the time of the next M-Map. In March 2017, the Minister of Transport announced the development of the Second Mass Rapid Transit Master Plan in Bangkok Metropolitan Region (M-Map 2). The Office of Transport and Traffic Policy and Planning (OTP) was the main agency responsible for this master plan's development, with technical assistance from the Japan International Cooperation Agency (JICA). 

The initial project materials listed the following lines as part of the plan:

In 2019, JICA released a Proposed M-MAP2 Blueprint study, outlining "key policy directions and measures based on which the M-MAP2 will be developed by the Thai Government". The Department of Rail Transport, OTP's successor agency for rail transport planning, is in the process of completing M-Map 2.

Lines outside of M-Map 2 
, the Grey and Light Blue line projects remain unapproved; however, the MRT Brown Line project, which will link Nonthaburi Civic Center with the Lam Sali intersection between Ramkhamhaeng and Srinagarindra roads, has gained cabinet approval. Additionally, a Gold Line along Charoen Nakhon road that starts at Krung Thonburi, partially funded by property developer Siam Piwat, has been operational outside of the M-Map framework since 2020 and is planned to be further extended towards the Memorial Bridge, linking it with the Purple Line extension that runs through the bridge's surrounding area.

Overview

Current operations

Under construction

Future planning

Notes

References

External links

Mass Rapid Transit Master Plan in Bangkok Metropolitan Region at the Office of Transport and Traffic Policy and Planning website
M-MAP2 Project website, Department of Rail Transport

Rapid transit in Bangkok
Transport in Bangkok
Proposed public transport in Thailand